Maggi is a Nestlé brand.

Maggi may also refer to:

Maggi (name)
Maggi & Me, Singaporean sitcom
Agropecuaria Maggi and Maggi Energy, part of Amaggi Group

See also
Magi (disambiguation)
Maggie (disambiguation)